Leary is an Irish surname and may refer to:

 King Leary or Lóegaire mac Néill, an Irish king
 Annie Leary, an American philanthropist and Papal Countess
 Arthur Leary, an American merchant
 Denis Leary (frequently misspelled as 'Dennis Leary'), an American actor, comedian, writer and film director
 Dennis Leary, an American restaurateur
 Lewis Sheridan Leary, a participant in John Brown's raid on Harpers Ferry
 Michael Leary, an association football player for Barnet F.C.
 Paul Leary, an American musician and record producer
 Richard P. Leary, US Navy admiral in the Spanish–American War
 Thomas B. Leary (1931–2021), American attorney
 Timothy Leary, an American psychologist, writer and counterculture icon
 Warren D. Leary, American politician

See also
Leary (disambiguation)
O'Leary (surname)
King Lear